Commecs College is a higher secondary intermediate school in Karachi, Sindh, Pakistan.

Commecs College is a not-for-profit, co-educational institution founded in 1993 by COMMECS, the alumni of the Govt. College of Commerce & Economics, by the Commecs Educational Trust (CET). The institute serves as a quality institution for improving the standard of business and science education in the country.

History

Background
Commecs College was founded in 1994 by Commecs Educational Trust (CET), a not-for-profit organization, formed by COMMECS (the alumni association of Government College of Commerce & Economics) in 1988. The trustees were concerned at the dearth of good educational institutions in the fields of business, science and technology. As its first step, CET established the Commecs Institute of Business Education (CIBE) in 1993. Three programmes were offered:

 Intermediate Commerce (affiliated with Board of Intermediate Education Karachi – BIEK)
 B.B.A (affiliated with IBA Karachi)
 B. Com. (affiliated with IBA Karachi)

The education standards were set to conform to the vision of the founders. Encouraged and motivated by its initial success, CET launched the science discipline in the year 2003 and changed the name of the school to Commecs Institute of Business and Emerging Sciences (CIBES).

In May 2007, CIBES received a charter from the government of Sindh and recognition from Higher Education Commission (HEC) as a Degree Awarding Institute and started its own BBA and MBA degree programmes, at 40-B PECHS. With this status IBA-affiliated programmes were discontinued.

Launch of PECHS Campus
There had been a persistent demand for Commecs College City campus that could cater to the needs of students living in PECHS, Garden, Defence and other neighbouring localities.

In the year 2013, on the occasion of its 20th anniversary, Commecs College announced the launch of a new campus in Block 6 PECHS and is currently offering intermediate in Commerce and Pre-Engineering disciplines.

Present
Commecs College at present is running an intermediate programme in affiliation with the Board of Intermediate Education Karachi (BIEK), and PGD/MBA Programme in affiliation with the Higher Education Commission (HEC) offering the disciplines of:

 Commerce
 Pre-Engineering
 Pre-Medical
 Computer Science
 Humanities
 Post Graduate Diploma In Islamic Banking & Finance

See also 
 List of universities in Karachi

External links 
 Commecs College | Official site
 Commecs Institute Of Business & Emerging Sciences | Official site
 Commecs Educational Trust | Official site
 Commecs College | Jauhar Campus | Facebook Official
 Commecs College | PECHS Campus | Facebook Official

Universities and colleges in Karachi
Educational institutions established in 1993
1993 establishments in Pakistan